Richard W. Sloley (20 August 1891 – 17 October 1946) was an English amateur footballer who played as an inside right in the Football League for Aston Villa. He was capped by England at amateur level and represented Great Britain at the 1920 Summer Olympics. Sloley formed short-lived amateur club Argonauts in 1928.

Personal life 
Sloley was a Cambridge Blue and as of 1911, was working as an assistant schoolmaster in Guildford. He served as a lieutenant in the Royal Army Service Corps during the First World War.

Career statistics

References

External links
 

English footballers
Brentford F.C. players
English Football League players
Association football inside forwards
Southern Football League players
Corinthian F.C. players
Sportspeople from Barnstaple
1891 births
Cambridge University A.F.C. players
England amateur international footballers
Aston Villa F.C. players
Olympic footballers of Great Britain
Footballers at the 1920 Summer Olympics
1946 deaths
Royal Army Service Corps officers
British Army personnel of World War I